Aleida Spex (born June 16, 1955) is a Cuban-American former professional tennis player.

Born in Cuba, Spex defected while competing at the 1974 Central American and Caribbean Games in Santo Domingo, where she won three medals for her native country. She initially sought refuge in the Embassy of Chile, but ended up in the United States.

Spex settled in Miami and was able to secure sponsorship to enable her to play on the professional tour. She twice qualified for the main draw of the Wimbledon Championships, including in 1976 when she made it through to the third round, with wins over Christina Sandberg and Isabel Fernández.

References

External links
 
 

1955 births
Living people
Cuban female tennis players
American female tennis players
Cuban emigrants to the United States
Central American and Caribbean Games medalists in tennis
Central American and Caribbean Games gold medalists for Cuba
Central American and Caribbean Games silver medalists for Cuba
Central American and Caribbean Games bronze medalists for Cuba
Competitors at the 1974 Central American and Caribbean Games
21st-century American women